Juncos is a town and one of the 78 municipalities of Puerto Rico. It is located in the eastern central region of the island to the west of the Caguas Valley, south of Canóvanas and Carolina; southeast of Gurabo; east of San Lorenzo; and west of Las Piedras. Juncos is spread over 9 barrios and Juncos barrio-pueblo (the downtown area and administrative center of the city). It is part of the San Juan-Caguas-Guaynabo Metropolitan Statistical Area.

Juncos was founded on the request of Tomás Pizarro on August 2, 1797, having previously been a village which evolved from a small ranch, the Hatillo de los Juncos. This ranch was part of the Hato del Valenciano, which gave its name to the Río Valenciano which bisects the city before joining the Río Gurabo to the north of the settlement.

Juncos is Spanish for reeds.

History
During the 17th century, large parts of the municipality were owned by the Hato Grande de los Delgado (The Delgados' Great Ranch). Another ranch, the Hato del Valenciano, was established and later divided into the Hatillo de los Lirios and the Hatillo de los Juncos. This second one became the village of Juncos in the 18th century and was given the status of a town on August 2, 1797. Reeds, which gave the city its name, feature in the center of its flag and the bottom of its coat of arms. The Hato del Valenciano is remembered in the name of the Río Valenciano, as well as the coat of arms of Valencia featuring in Juncos' coat of arms, in addition to the city's two nicknames of La Ciudad del Valenciano (The Valenciano City) and Los Mulos del Valenciano (The Valenciano's Mules).

Puerto Rico was ceded by Spain in the aftermath of the Spanish–American War under the terms of the Treaty of Paris of 1898 and became a territory of the United States. In 1899, the United States Department of War conducted a census of Puerto Rico finding that the population of Juncos was 8,429.

On September 20, 2017 Hurricane Maria struck Puerto Rico. Juncos had been declared a disaster zone a week earlier when Hurricane Irma made landfall only to be hit again. Destruction to homes and infrastructure was estimated at $25 million. Maria triggered numerous landslides in Juncos with its significant wind and rainfall.

Symbols
The  has an official flag and coat of arms.

Flag
On the flag of Juncos, on a gold field, blue waving stripes cross horizontally in the lower half. These represent the Río Valenciano which bisects the city. Green reeds with red buds appear in a central point above the stripes, representing the city's name (Juncos is Spanish for reeds).

Coat of arms
Juncos' coat of arms is divided into four-quarters, with the upper left and lower right containing vertical stripes gold (or yellow) and gules (red) in reference to the Spanish region of Valencia and to its denomination as "Town of Valencia". The upper right quarter is blue with twelve silver stars to represent the Virgin Mary, and also features a cross confirming the city as part of Christendom. The lower right is split vertically between an image of a tobacco plant to represent the city's agriculture and a chimney to represent industrialization and sugar cane processing. Like the flag, a waving blue line representing the Río Valenciano crosses the shield horizontally.

The shield is topped with a civic crown in the shape of a three-towered castle. Underneath the shield lie the red-budded green reeds which gave the city its name, which features alongside its year of foundation (1797) at the very bottom.

Geography
Juncos is in the central eastern part of the island.

Barrios

Like all municipalities of Puerto Rico, Juncos is subdivided into barrios.

Caimito
Ceiba Norte
Ceiba Sur
Gurabo Abajo
Gurabo Arriba
Juncos barrio-pueblo
Lirios
Mamey
Valenciano Abajo
Valenciano Arriba

Sectors
Barrios (which are like minor civil divisions) and subbarrios, in turn, are further subdivided into smaller local populated place areas/units called sectores (sectors in English). The types of sectores may vary, from normally sector to urbanización to reparto to barriada to residencial, among others.

Special Communities

 (Special Communities of Puerto Rico) are marginalized communities whose citizens are experiencing a certain amount of social exclusion. A map shows these communities occur in nearly every municipality of the commonwealth. Of the 742 places that were on the list in 2014, the following barrios, communities, sectors, or neighborhoods were in Juncos: 
Flores, Santana 1 in Ceiba Norte, Canta Gallo, El Caracol, La Cuesta in Sector El Mangó, La Hormiga, Lirios Dorados in Hoyo Hondo and Rosalía in Sector El Mangó.

Climate

Demographics

Tourism 

Juncos Sugar Mill
Old Tobacco Farm
Juncos Plaza Shopping Center
Paseo Escuté
El Tenedor Restaurant
Casa Vieja Cafe 
Teatro Junqueño (Juncos Theater)

Culture

Festivals and events
Juncos celebrates its patron saint festival in December. The  is a religious and cultural celebration that generally features parades, games, artisans, amusement rides, regional food, and live entertainment.

Other festivals and events celebrated in Juncos include:
Modesto Carrión International Marathon – November
La Mina Christian Music fest – July
Plenazo Junqueño – February

Economy
In the fertile plains of the Río Valenciano, coffee, fruits, sugar cane and tobacco are grown. The lower left quarter of the municipal coat of arms pay homage to tobacco cultivation and sugar cane processing.

Apparel, electronic machinery and electrical equipment, scientific instruments, pharmaceutical and biotechnology industries

Amgen, a biopharmaceutical company, has developed its largest manufacturing site in Juncos. It is a biotechnology campus for bulk manufacturing, with laboratories and manufacturing facilities that employs close to 3000 people. Amgen Puerto Rico received FDA approval for bulk manufacturing facilities for Nepogen (filgrastim), Neulasta (pegfilgrastim), Aranesp and Epogen. Amgen is also adding manufacturing capacity in Juncos to produce Denosumab.

In addition to Amgen there is a Medtronic and Becton Dickinson Caribe Ltd. in Juncos. The Colgate pharmaceutical facility has closed and production shifted to Mexico.

Government

Alfredo Alejandro Carrión of the People's Democratic Party is the incumbent mayor of the municipality of Juncos, since the year 2000.

The city belongs to the Senatorial District of Humacao (District VII), which is represented by two senators. The current senators are Rosamar Trujillo Plumey (PPD) and Wanda Soto Tolentino (PNP).

The city is part of the 33 Representative District, which is represented by one representative. The current representative is Ángel Peña Ramírez of the New Progressive Party since 2008.

Transportation 
There are 28 bridges in Juncos.

Under the administration of Alfredo "Papo" Alejandro, Juncos started a collective ferry-on-wheels transportation system.

Sports
Roberto Clemente Walker, later a double-World Series winner for the Pittsburgh Pirates, played baseball for Juncos before signing with the Santurce Crabbers in Puerto Rico's Professional League. As is the national norm, volleyball and basketball are biggest sports in Juncos. In the year 2006–2007 the Valencianas de Juncos won the women's basketball and volleyball superior league national championship. In 2009, Juncos became the home of the 2008 Puerto Rico Soccer League champions, Sevilla Bayamon FC. The club is now known as Sevilla-FC Juncos since being relocated to the city. The team moved to Juncos due to ownership and financial problems and currently play in the Alfredo "Papo" Alejandro Stadium.

Natives

Félix Conde Falcón
Gisselle
Rita Moreno
Alfredo Alejandro Carrión
Rafael Celestino Benítez
Juan Manuel López (boxer)
Felicitas Mendez
María de Lourdes Ramos Rivera
José Luis Moneró
José Raul Soto

See also

List of Puerto Ricans
History of Puerto Rico
Did you know-Puerto Rico?

References

Further reading

External links 
 Juncos Municipality on Facebook
 Puerto Rico Government Directory – Juncos
 Juncos and its barrios, United States Census Bureau

 
Municipalities of Puerto Rico
Populated places established in 1797
San Juan–Caguas–Guaynabo metropolitan area